Togo is a multilingual country, which according to one count has 44 languages spoken. The official language is French. In 1975, the government designated two indigenous languages - Ewé and Kabiyé - as national languages, meaning that they are promoted in formal education and the media. The two national languages tend to be used regionally with Ewé used in the south from Lomé to Blitta, and Kabiyé from Blitta to Dapaong in the north.

Togo joined the Commonwealth in June 2022. Prior to its admission at the 2022 Commonwealth Heads of Government Meeting, Foreign Minister Robert Dussey said that he expected Commonwealth membership to provide opportunities for Togolese citizens to learn English and access new educational and cultural resources. He also remarked that the country sought "to forge closer ties with the anglophone world."

References 

 Le français au Togo: une aventure ambigüe, Isabelle Anzorge, Université Nice, 1998.

External links